Bhiwani–Mahendragarh Lok Sabha constituency is one of the ten Lok Sabha (parliamentary) constituencies in Haryana state in northern India. This constituency came into existence in 2008 as a part of the implementation of the recommendations of the Delimitation Commission of India constituted in 2002.

This constituency was created by merging four assembly segments, Ateli, Mahendragarh, Narnaul and Nangal Chaudhry of the former 
Mahendragarh constituency and five assembly segments, Loharu, Badhra, Dadri, Bhiwani and Tosham of the erstwhile Bhiwani and Charkhi Dadri constituency. This constituency covers the major part of Bhiwani district and the entire Mahendragarh district.

Assembly segments
At present, Bhiwani–Mahendragarh Lok Sabha constituency comprises nine Vidhan Sabha (legislative assembly) constituencies. These are:

Members of Parliament

Election Results

2019

2014

General elections 2009

See also
 Bhiwani (Lok Sabha constituency)
 Mahendragarh (Lok Sabha constituency)
 List of Constituencies of the Lok Sabha

References

Lok Sabha constituencies in Haryana
Bhiwani district
Mahendragarh district